Miguel Ángel Murillo García (born 19 October 1993) is a Colombian professional footballer who plays as forward for Alianza F.C..

External links 
 

1993 births
Living people
Colombian footballers
Colombian expatriate footballers
Categoría Primera A players
Uruguayan Primera División players
Deportivo Cali footballers
Peñarol players
C.D. Veracruz footballers
Águilas Doradas Rionegro players
Liga MX players
Expatriate footballers in Uruguay
Expatriate footballers in Mexico
Colombian expatriate sportspeople in Uruguay
Colombian expatriate sportspeople in Mexico
Footballers from Cali
Association football forwards